Molossops  (meaning: false molossus bat) is a genus of bat in the family Molossidae. 
The four member species are found in nearly every country of South America, with the dwarf dog-faced bat being found in the most countries. 
It contains only two species:
 Rufous dog-faced bat (Molossops neglectus)
 Dwarf dog-faced bat (Molossops temminckii)

Judith L. Eger writes that the genus only consists of M. neglectus and M. temminckii; M. aequatorianus  (= Cabreramops ) and M. mattogrossensis  (= Neoplatymops ) were incorrectly assigned to this genus.

References

 
Molossidae
Bat genera
Taxa named by Wilhelm Peters
Taxonomy articles created by Polbot